Pray is the fifth studio album from Christian pop and rock artist Rebecca St. James. It was released on October 20, 1998 by ForeFront Records and was certified Gold by the RIAA in September 2006. The album won a Grammy Award for Rock Gospel Album of the Year, St. James's only Grammy so far. The album was produced by Tedd T.

Track listing

Personnel 
 Rebecca St. James – lead vocals, backing vocals (1, 2, 3, 5, 6, 7, 9, 10)
 Michael Quinlan – programming (1, 8, 11), guitars (4, 6, 10)
 Tedd T – programming (2, 3, 5-11), guitars (2, 4, 8)
 Byron Hagen – keyboards (6, 9, 10)
 Julian Kindred – keyboards (10)
 Charles Garrett – guitars
 George Cocchini – guitars (1, 3, 6, 7, 9, 10)
 Vince Emmett – guitars (1, 4, 6, 9)
 Andrew Ramsey – guitars (2)
 Lynn Nichols – guitars (6)
 Brent Milligan – bass (1, 5, 6, 8), guitars (8)
 James Gregory – bass (3, 7, 9, 10)
 Kevin Vonderhoffen – bass (4)
 Raymond Boyd – drums (1, 3, 6, 7, 9, 10)
 Scott Williamson – drums (2, 5)
 Derek Wyatt – drums (4), drum loops (10)
 Dan Needham – drums (8)
 Carl Marsh – strings (1)
 Eric Hauck – cello (4)
 John Catchings – strings (7, 9)
 David Davidson – strings (7, 9)
 Kristin Wilkinson – strings (7, 9)
 Daniel Smallbone – backing vocals (1, 6, 7)
 Tasia Tjornhom – backing vocals (1, 2, 5, 7, 9, 10)
 Holly Burt – backing vocals (6)
 Luke Smallbone – backing vocals (6)
 Josh Smallbone – backing vocals (6)
 Matthew White – backing vocals (6)

Choir on "Omega"
 Pearl Barrett, Byron Hagen, Michael Jones, Michael Quinlan, Mark Sizemore, Luke Smallbone, Ben Smallbone, Daniel Smallbone, Joel Smallbone, Josh Smallbone, Evan Smith, Kay Dekalb Smith, Jeanette Sullivan, Tasia Tjornhom, Luke Williams and Rock Williams

Production 
 Tedd T – producer 
 Dan R. Brock – executive producer 
 Eddie DeGarmo – executive producer
 Michael Quinlan – additional production
 Julian Kindred – additional production, recording, mixing (1, 2, 3, 6, 8, 9)
 Paul "Salvo" Salveson – mixing (4, 5, 7, 10)
 Marcelo Pennell – mixing (11)
 Shane D. Wilson – mixing ("Be Thou My Vision")
 Jim McCaslin – mix assistant 
 Jim Adams – additional mix assistant 
 Joseph Castroita – additional mix assistant 
 David Das – additional mix assistant 
 Jon Hewitt – additional mix assistant 
 Kevin B. Hipp – editing
 Stephen Marcussen – mastering
 Tasia Tjornhom – project administrator 
 Cindy Simmons – art direction 
 Kerosene Halo – design 
 Mark Tucker – photography 
 David Smallbone – management

Charts
Album - Billboard (North America)

Singles - CCM Magazine (North America)

Radio success 
In the United States the lead single "Pray" did well on the Christian Charts, while "Omega (Radio Remix)" also got good radio airplay. The song "Peace" did extremely well and is still heard on Christian Radio, ten years later in 2008. In the UK, "Pray", "I'll Carry You" and "Peace" all landed in the Top 100 Songs of 1999, while in Australia "Peace", "Give Myself Away", "Pray" and "OK" all made the Top 100 Songs of 1999. In 2000 "Omega" and "Come Quickly Lord" both landed in the Top 100 Songs of 2000 in Australia. Though never released as a single the song "Mirror" has become a major fan favorite.

Compilation contributions 
WOW 1999... "Pray (Radio Edit)"
WOW 2000... "Omega (Radio Remix)"
People Get Ready: A Musical Collection Inspired by the Left Behind Series... "Come Quickly Lord"
Power Jams... "I'll Carry You (Remix)"
Listen:Louder... "Omega (Remix)"
Wait for Me: The Best from Rebecca St. James... "Pray" and "Mirror"
Rebecca St. James: The Ultimate Collection... "Pray" and "Mirror"
Rebecca St. James: The Greatest Hits... "Pray" and "Mirror"

No Secrets VHS/"Yes, I Believe In God" Single 
In 1999, Rebecca released a VHS to go with the Pray album. It was entitled No Secrets and it featured interviews with herself, her family and some of her friends and fellow recording artists, plus the "Pray" Music Video. For a limited time the VHS came with a Yes, I Believe In God Single with 3 tracks:
Yes, I Believe in God
Omega Radio Remix
Pray Remix

References

1998 albums
ForeFront Records albums
Grammy Award for Best Rock Gospel Album
Rebecca St. James albums